Te Karere is a news and current affairs show that was New Zealand's first Māori language television programme. Te Karere is broadcast on Television New Zealand's TVNZ 1 at 3:55 pm on weekdays and repeated 1:05 am and 5:35 am the following day. The focus of the programme is content which is of national significance to the targeted Māori audience.

The programme is funded in its entirety by Te Māngai Pāho.

History 
Te Karere first went to air during Māori Language Week, with a two minute bulletin celebrating the week in 1982. The original presenters and producers were Derek Fox and Whai Ngata.  

The following year, Te Karere got a regular slot of four minutes. With a modest, shoestring budget, Fox and Ngata produced a professional news show. The show was originally broadcast on TV2, but as that channel had poor coverage on the East Coast, with its large Māori population, Te Karere was moved to TV1. 

The show later expanded to 15, and then to 30 minutes in 2009.

Reporters
The award-winning Māori broadcaster Tini Molyneux began her broadcasting career on Te Karere in the 1980s.
Harata Brown (Reporter, Northland)
Oriini Kaipara (Reporter, 2013-2016)
Te Rina Kowhai (Reporter, 2018-2022)
Te Okiwa Mclean (Reporter, Wellington)
Moana Makapelu Lee (Reporter, Rotorua - Bay of Plenty)
Scotty Morrison (News Anchor, 2003-)
Rapaera Tawhai (Reporter, Tauranga - Bay of Plenty)
Aroha Treacher (Reporter, Hawke's Bay)
Victor Waters (Reporter, Sports)

Producers
Roihana Nuri (Executive Producer)
Paora Maxwell (Executive Producer, 2008-2013)
Arana Taumata (Executive Producer)
Shane Taurima (Executive Producer, 2006-2012)

References

External links
 Te Karere's TVNZ Website
 Te Karere's IMDB Site

Māori culture
Māori language
New Zealand television news shows
1982 New Zealand television series debuts
1980s New Zealand television series
1990s New Zealand television series
2000s New Zealand television series
2010s New Zealand television series
2020s New Zealand television series
TVNZ 1 original programming
Television shows funded by NZ on Air
Māori-language mass media